Felipe Pascucci (Genoa, 24 June 1907 – 18 December 1966) was an Italian football manager who coached Argentina in the 1934 FIFA World Cup. He also coached Club Atlético River Plate. Until today, he remains the only non-Argentine to coach Argentina.

References 

1907 births
1966 deaths
Italian football managers
Italian expatriate football managers
Club Atlético River Plate managers
Argentina national football team managers
1934 FIFA World Cup managers
Sportspeople from Genoa